Tuital Holy Spirit Church is a Christian church in Dharmapalli, Tuital, Nayanshree union, Nawabganj upazila, Dhaka division, Bangladesh. It is the only religious institution for the Christian community in the village.

History 
A large church, "Rani Japamala Church" was established at Hasanabad in Nawabganj. As a branch of this organization, several churches and missionary schools were established in the surrounding villages. The 'Tuital Church of the Holy Spirit' and the then missionary school 'Tuital Girls School and College' were approved.

After being under Hasanabad for about 120 years, Tuital Dharmapalli was established on 15 May 1894; in 1924, a new church was built next to the current church, which was named, "Tuital Church of the Holy Spirit".

After the construction of the church in 1924, it was renovated several times. A new version was built on the site in 1993.

In media 
The shooting of the 1933 film Ekattorer Jishu (Jesus of the Seventy One), based on Shahriar Kabir's novel of the same name, took place on the banks of the church and the river Ichhamati.

Gallery

References 

Churches in Bangladesh
Buildings and structures in Dhaka Division
Buildings and structures completed in 1924